The Súľov Mountains (in Slovak, Súľovské vrchy) is a rugged mountain range in Slovakia, the northwestern part of the Fatra-Tatra Area of the Inner Western Carpathians.  Its highest peak is Veľký Manín, at 890 meters.

The Súľov Mountains is the location of:

 the Súľov Rocks, a national nature reserve open for hiking and rock-climbing.  The highest peak in this area is Žibrid (867 meters)
 the national nature reserves of the Manínska Gorge and the Kostolecká Gorge
 the Bosmany natural monument
 the extensive castle ruins of the 13th century Lietava Castle and the 15th century Súľovský Castle

A portion of the Súľovs is also protected by the Strážov Mountains Protected Landscape Area.

References

Mountain ranges of Slovakia
Mountain ranges of the Western Carpathians